The following is a comprehensive discography of Rainbow, an English hard rock band. They have released 8 studio albums, 15 live albums, 17 compilation albums, 8 box sets, 3 EPs and 24 singles.

Albums

Studio albums

Live albums

Compilation albums

Box sets

EPs

Singles

Promotional singles

Videos

Video albums

Music videos

Notes

References

External links

Heavy metal group discographies
Discographies of British artists